A successor company takes the business (products and services) of the previous companies with the goal to maintain the continuity of the business. To this end the employees, board of directors, location, equipment and even product name may remain the same or change only slightly at the moment of succession.

The major advantage is saving the money for the initial ramp-up (employee training, equipment purchase, marketing, etc). If the previous company was failing, this is a disadvantage for its successors in various respects. If the successor succeeds where the predecessor failed, the company may be called a "Phoenix company" ("rising from the ashes"). In general, the successor is not responsible for the liabilities of the predecessor, unless the consent was given to this, or a court decided that the succession was not "clean hands"; e.g., the successor was de facto the same company, of the succession transfer was an instrument to avoid liabilities.

In the corporate world, successor corporations are typically created by mergers and acquisitions or liquidation of existing businesses. In order to conclude whether a corporation is a legal successor of previous businesses, connections between them must be analyzed. A rather evident case is when the corporations keep nearly the same senior management or there is a close connection between the old and new management. Other contributing indicators include same trade, same workforce, similar company and product names, and substantial asset transfer between successors and predecessors 

The term successor in business has similar meanings. Various legal documents typically include formal definitions of the terms used in them, including the ones discussed here. A typical example would be: "Successor in Business means (a) an entity which acquires all or substantially all of the undertaking and/or assets of either Issuer or of a successor in business of either Issuer; or (b) any entity into which any of the previously referred to entity is amalgamated, merged or reconstructed and is itself not the continuing company".

In the case of liquidation or dissolution, there may or may not be a legal successor created.

See also
Corporate spin-off

References

Corporate finance
Corporations
Business ownership